The Ries Railway is the current name of the line between Aalen and Donauwörth via Nördlingen. The name is derived from the Nördlinger Ries depression, and the line is operated by Deutsche Bahn (DB).

The line consists of a section of the Aalen–Nördlingen railway built by the Kingdom of Württemberg as the Rems Railway and a section of the Nördlingen–Donauwörth railway built as part of the Ludwig South-North Railway by the Kingdom of Bavaria, two of the oldest lines in Germany.

Operations 

The line is electrified and built as a single-track, except for the two-track section between Aalen and Goldshöfe.

The height of some platform edges is below the minimum standard of about 38 cm above the rails and the island platforms of smaller stations can only be reached by plank crossings over the tracks. The stations of Hoppingen, Ebermergen and Wörnitzstein have gravel platforms. The stations between Aalen and Nördlingen were extensively renovated with the exception of Goldshöfe station in 2009. Dynamic information displays were installed and the underpass was rebuilt at Nördlingen station in 2011. In addition, the stations of Wörnitzstein and Möttingen received new shelters. The latter station as well as the halts of Hoppingen and Ebermergen were also equipped with dynamic information displays in 2012.

Regional services
Regionalbahn trains operate on the route every hour on weekday and every two hours on weekends. Trains are mostly operated as electric multiple units consisting of Alstom Coradia Continental (class 440) sets. The journey time in 2015, according to the annual timetable from Aalen to Donauwörth was 70 minutes. In the opposite direction trains take 83 minutes (13 minutes longer), because on the single track line the crossing stations are not located appropriately for symmetric scheduling. The crossings places are at Möttingen and Bopfingen.

Goldshöfe Station was originally built not to serve the location, but as a junction station on the lines from Aalen to Nördlingen and to Crailsheim. It is now used by many people from the nearby Hüttlingen community.

Freight traffic 
The major freight user is the Marker cement plant in Harburg. The Schwäbische Hüttenwerke (steelworks) in Wasseralfingen is also served by freight trains.

Diversion route 
In the case of closures on the Stuttgart–Ulm–Augsburg route, the Ries Railway forms part of a diversion route for long distance traffic between Stuttgart and Munich.

As a result, before the Olympic Games in Munich, in 1971 and 1972, the line was electrified from Schorndorf to Donauwörth via Aalen and Nördlingen.

History 
The line was built as part of the Ludwig South-North Railway, opened between Donauwörth and Nördlingen on 15 September 1847, and the Rems Railway, opened between Aalen and Wasseralfingen on 25 July 1861 and extended to Nördlingen in 1863.

In recent years the Ries Railway has been interrupted repeatedly by landslides at different points. The longest of these interruptions was at the Bildwasen tunnel between Lauchheim and Aufhausen between December 2002 and December 2003. It affected the tunnel entrance, which has now been extensively renovated. In the same period, from February 2003 to July 2003, a large slip occurred on a flood embankment between Ebermergen and Donauwörth, bringin traffic on the line almost to a complete halt. These circumstances prompted considerations of closing the track. Before the blocking the route, many trains ran continuously from the Rems Railway to Donauwörth. Since the reopening of the route operations on the Ries Railway are run almost entirely independently.

References

Footnotes

Sources

Railway lines in Bavaria
Railway lines in Baden-Württemberg
Railway lines opened in 1847
Buildings and structures in Ostalbkreis
Buildings and structures in Donau-Ries